Jenő Ghyczy de Ghicz, Assakürt et Ablánczkürt (4 May 1893 – 18 January 1982) was a Hungarian politician, who served as Minister of Foreign Affairs between 1943 and 1944.

References
 Magyar Életrajzi Lexikon

1893 births
1982 deaths
People from Komárno District
Foreign ministers of Hungary
Jeno